The Valkyrior is a fictional organization appearing in American comic books published by Marvel Comics. Based on the Valkyries of Norse mythology, the group, created by Stan Lee and Jack Kirby, first appeared in Thor #133 (October 1966). Within the context of Marvel's shared universe, the Valkyrior is a group of female warriors led by Brunnhilde / Valkyrie that was originally designated by Odin to bring the souls of slain heroes to Valhalla. In 2013, the team became the subject of the short-lived series, The Fearless Defenders.

Publication history
The Valkyrior, created by Stan Lee and Jack Kirby, first appeared in Thor #133 (October 1966). The team, led by Valkyrie  and Misty Knight is the subject of the 2013 series, The Fearless Defenders by Cullen Bunn and Will Sliney. Bun said about his book: "The basic idea of the book is that Valkyrie is choosing a new team of Valkyrior, and she's been asked to choose all these women from the heroes of Midgard, instead of from Asgard. She has completely failed in this task. Valkyrie has been unable to choose anyone that she feels is worthy to be one of the hosts of the shield maidens. So she just hasn't done it. She's dropped the ball. Because she's not done what she said she would do, nature—or supernature, as it is—abhors a vacuum. The absence of the Valkyrior has opened the door to something terrible. Something awful is waking, and Valkyrie finds that it's really her fault that she's put everything at risk".

Fictional history
The Valkyrior are warrior goddesses of Asgard who ride winged horses. Originally, under the leadership of Brunnhilde, they took mortally wounded human heroes from German and Scandinavian battlegrounds and brought them to Valhalla, an area of the Asgardian dimension where the astral forms of the dead Asgardians and human heroes eternally feast and compete in friendly battles. The Valkyries were no longer able to perform this task when Odin, ruler of Asgard, vowed to the Celestials  a millennium ago that he would severely restrict Asgardian contact with Earth.

In later years, Brunnhilde became a member of Earth's Defenders. The remaining Valkyries were killed in a war between Odin and Hela over rule of Valhalla. Odin restored the Valkyries to life after he regained possession of Valhalla, but these Valkyries only have physical form within Valhalla; outside it, they exist only in astral form. Valtrauta has taken Brunnhilde's place as ruler of the Valkyrior, and Hildegarde's sister Krista (aka Mist) has filled the role of the ninth Valkyrie, left open since Brunnhilde's departure.

During the "War of the Realms" storyline, Valkyrie and the rest of the Valkrior are massacred by Malekith and his forces invading New York. During the battle, Valkyrie is beheaded by Malekith. Afterwards, Jane Foster then takes up the mantle of Valkyrie.

Members

Asgard Valkyrior
 Axe – a member of the Valkyrior
 Brunnhilde – leader
 Danielle Moonstar – an original member of the New Mutants, she joined the Valkyrior
 Freya – the Goddess of Fertility who used to work as a former Valkyrie
 Gerda – a member of the Valkyrior
 Grimgerta – a member of the Valkyrior
 Gruenhilda – a member of the Valkyrior
 Hercara – a member of the Valkyrior
 Fatal Sisters – a trio of Valkyries
 Hilda – a member of the Valkyrior
 Mista – a member of the Valkyrior
 Sangrida – a member of the Valkyrior
 Hildegarde – a gifted Asgardian Valkyrie with extraordinary strength and great skills with the sword
 Krista – a member of the Valkyrior and sister of Hildegarde, she was kidnapped by Pluto so the Asgardians would go to war against the Olympians, but thankfully she was saved by Thor and Hercules
 Leita – a member of the Valkyrior
 Mist – a member of the Valkyrior, she invited Danielle to join them
 Rossveissa – also known as Svava, she is a member of the Valkyrior, but forced to serve Hela
 Sygnet – a member of the Valkyrior
 Valtrauta – a member of the Valkyrior
 Jane Foster – first of a new generation of Valkyrior, she wields Undrajarn the All-Weapon, a weapon that can change its shape and be whatever she needs, such as a sword, mace, or wings
Rūna-- Rūna is one of the original nine Valkyries and the original wielder of Jarnbjorn.

Defenders Valkyrior
 Brunnhilde – leader
 Misty Knight – leader
 Elsa Bloodstone – a member of the Valkyrior
 Clea – a member of the Valkyrior
 Danielle Moonstar – a former member of the Valkyrior
 Nova – a member of the Valkyrior
 Ren Kimura – an Inhuman member of the Valkyrior, girlfriend of Annabelle
 Annabelle Riggs – a member of the Valkyrior, girlfriend of Ren
 Hippolyta – a member of the Valkyrior, girlfriend of Ren

Disir
 Brün – leader of the Disir, she was the first one to be cursed by Bor due to their rebellion when working with Sigurd
 Göndul – a member of the Disir, she is a coward and a fool
 Hlökk – a member of the Disir
 Kára – a member of the Disir

In other media
The Valkyrior appear in the 2017 live-action film Thor: Ragnarok. Odin sent them to Hel to prevent Hela from escaping. However, the attack turned into a massacre, as Hela killed every Valkyrie with the exception of Valkyrie / Scrapper 142. The trauma of the massacre led Valkyrie to abandon Asgard and settle on Sakaar.

References

External links

Fictional characters by gendered occupation
Fictional matriarchies
Fictional secret societies
Fictional women soldiers and warriors
Marvel Comics superhero teams